The  is a kei car produced by Mitsubishi Motors from December 1994 until June 2012.

Overview
Based on the platform of the Minica, the Pajero Mini was styled as a miniature version of the company's successful Pajero sport utility vehicle, in response to the SUV craze of the late 1980s and early 1990s. Compared to the full-sized original, the kei vehicle was considerably smaller and was fitted with petrol 660 cc four-cylinder engines.

The popularity of the vehicle inspired Mitsubishi to create several limited editions, including the "Iron Cross", "Desert Cruiser", "White Skipper" and "Duke".

First generation (1994; H51/56A)

The original Pajero Mini was first presented in December 1994. Front- or four-wheel drive were available, with 2WD models receiving the H51A model code and four-wheel drives being H56A. A larger-engined version with a wider track (and correspondingly larger fender flares) was presented in October 1995; this was sold as the Mitsubishi Pajero Junior. The turbocharged models were VR-I or VR-II depending on equipment levels, while the naturally aspirated versions were called XR-I and XR-II. The "-I" versions received little standard equipment and can easily be recognized by their steel wheels, black bumpers and other trim such as door handles and rear view mirrors, and minimal brightwork. The more expensive -II models were usually painted two-tone and often receive alloy wheels and various pieces of chrome trim.

In May 1996 the Pajero Mini "Skipper", a special version for urban and town use, was released. The name is a reference to Mitsubishi's Minica Skipper kei car coupé of the early 1970s. In December 1997, the Pajero Mini Duke was released. This had a somewhat more rugged appearance, including sturdy cladding along the sides and a grille with upright bars, a reference to Jeeps and Mitsubishi's history of license manufacturing the CJ-3B for four-and-a-half decades.

Second generation (1998; H53/58A)

In October 1998 the kei car regulations were again updated, and the Pajero Mini was widened and lengthened accordingly at the same time. The "Duke" special model was carried over; it now received a larger, deeper set grille with vertical rather than horizontal bars.

In Japan, the Pajero Mini was sold at a specific retail chain called Galant Shop.

Production of the Mitsubishi Pajero Mini ended in June 2012.

Annual production and sales

(Sources: Facts & Figures 2000, Facts & Figures 2001, Facts & Figures 2005, Facts & Figures 2009, Mitsubishi Motors website)

References

External links

 Pajero Mini (Japanese)
 Pajero Mini VR (4WD) specifications, Mitsubishi-motors.com

2000s cars
Pajero Mini
All-wheel-drive vehicles
Kei sport utility vehicles
Kei cars
Cars introduced in 1994